Fosterella schidosperma is a species of flowering plant in Bromeliaceae family. It is native to Peru and Bolivia.

Two varieties are recognized:

Fosterella schidosperma var. schidosperma 
Fosterella schidosperma var. vestita L.B.Sm. & Read

References

schidosperma
Flora of Peru
Flora of Bolivia
Plants described in 1876
Taxa named by Lyman Bradford Smith
Taxa named by John Gilbert Baker